John McIndoe (29 November 1858–4 April 1916) was a New Zealand printer. He was born in Rothesay, Bute, Scotland on 29 November 1858.

He married the painter Mabel Hill in 1898. One son, Archibald McIndoe, was a plastic surgeon; and another son, John McIndoe, was an artist who took over the family printing firm.

References

1858 births
1916 deaths
Printers
Scottish emigrants to New Zealand
People from Rothesay, Bute
Hill-McIndoe-Gillies family